John O'Rourke (December 1, 1834 – May 5, 1882) was an American politician and businessman.

Career
Born in Ireland, O'Rourke emigrated to the United States in 1857 and settled in Milwaukee, Wisconsin. He was a book-keeper for the John Fitzgerald firm of Milwaukee and a time conductor for the Chicago & Northwestern Railroad. He served in the 6th Wisconsin Volunteer Infantry Regiment and in the 1st Illinois Light Artillery, Battery L during the American Civil War. He then moved to Juneau County, Wisconsin and continued to work for the John Fitzgerald firm. In 1868, he served in the Wisconsin State Assembly for Juneau County and lived in the town of Kildare, Wisconsin. He also served as Juneau County treasurer. In November 1874, O'Rourke moved to Plattsmouth, Nebraska and was the assistant cashier for the First National Bank. He was elected treasurer of the Plattsmouth Board of Trade in Plattsmouth, Nebraska. In April 1881, O'Rourke was elected mayor of Plattsmouth and served until 1882 just before his death. He was involved with the Democratic Party. O'Rourke died in St. Louis, Missouri.

Legacy
O'Rourke was the subject of the American Civil War song "When Johnny Comes Marching Home." The lyrics were written by Patrick Gilmore, the brother of his future wife, Annie Maria Gilmore.

Notes

External links

19th-century Irish people
1834 births
1882 deaths
Irish emigrants to the United States (before 1923)
People from Plattsmouth, Nebraska
People from Juneau County, Wisconsin
Politicians from Milwaukee
People of Illinois in the American Civil War
People of Wisconsin in the American Civil War
Businesspeople from Nebraska
Businesspeople from Wisconsin
Nebraska Democrats
Mayors of places in Nebraska
County officials in Wisconsin
19th-century American politicians
19th-century American businesspeople
Democratic Party members of the Wisconsin State Assembly